The Taipei Marathon is an annual long-distance marathon event in Asia that has been held since 1986. World Athletics has certified it as an Elite Label road race. 

Kenyan long distance runner Paul Lonyangata won the 2020 race and set a course record of 2:09:18; Ethiopian marathoner Alemtsehay Asifa won the race twice in 2021 and 2022, and currently holds the course record of 2:25:55.

Winners 
Key

Men's open division

Women's open division

Victories by nationality

References 

 
Taipei